Moreirense Futebol Clube is a Portuguese professional football club based in Moreira de Cónegos, Guimarães Municipality, in Minho. Founded on 1 November 1938, it plays in the Liga Portugal 2, holding home games at Parque de Jogos Comendador Joaquim de Almeida Freitas, with a capacity for 9,000 spectators.

History
Moreirense was founded in 1938. It first reached the Liga de Honra in 1995, where they stayed five seasons. After being relegated to Segunda Divisão, manager Manuel Machado took the team and in two years managed two promotions, getting the team for the first time to top flight. He led the northerners for two more seasons, in which Moreirense achieved two mid-table positions, finishing ninth in the latter season.

After Machado departed for neighbouring Vitória de Guimarães, the club suffered two consecutive relegations, only returning again to the second level in 2010, and the first in 2012. After an immediate relegation, the team won the 2013–14 Segunda Liga under manager Toni Conceição.

Moreirense achieved its first top level national title on 29 January 2017, winning the League Cup (Taça da Liga) by defeating S.C. Braga in the final.

In 2018–19, manager Ivo Vieira led Moreirense to a best-ever sixth place, missing out on the fifth place only on goal difference to Vitória de Guimarães, who Vieira left the club for.

Honours

National
Taça da Liga
Winners (1): 2016–17

Segunda Liga
Winners (2): 2001–02, 2013–14

Portuguese Second Division
Winners (2): 1994–95, 2000–01

Regional
AF Braga Second Division
Winners (1): 1942–43

Recent league history

Players

Current squad

Out on loan

Managerial history

  Armindo Cunha (1991–92)
  Ferreirinha (1993–94)
  Carlos Garcia (1994 – May 30, 1999)
  Bernardino Pedroto (May 30, 1999 – Dec 9, 1999)
  João Cavaleiro (Dec 9, 1999 – May 14, 2000)
  Manuel Machado (June 2, 2000 – June 5, 2004)
  Vítor Oliveira (June 7, 2004 – April 3, 2005)
  Jorge Jesus (April 5, 2005 – May 22, 2005)
  Vítor Paneira (May 23, 2005 – Oct 17, 2005)
  João Carlos Pereira (Oct 17, 2005 – Feb 27, 2006)
  José Gomes (March 1, 2006 – May 5, 2006)
  Dito (June 15, 2006 – Nov 13, 2007)
  Daniel Ramos (Nov 13, 2007 – May 4, 2008)
  Nicolau Vaqueiro (2008 – May 12, 2009)
  Jorge Casquilha (2009 – Jan 30, 2013)
  Augusto Inácio (Jan 30, 2013 – May 19, 2013)
  Vítor Oliveira (May 20, 2013 – March 10, 2014)
  Toni Conceição (March 10, 2014 – May 15, 2014)
  Miguel Leal (July 1, 2014 – May 19, 2016)
  Pepa (May 20, 2016 – November 21, 2016)
  Leandro Mendes (November 22, 2016 – November 28, 2016)
  Augusto Inácio (November 28, 2016 – March 20, 2017)
  Petit (March 20, 2017 – May 26, 2017)
  Manuel Machado (May 27, 2017 – October 28, 2017)
  Sérgio Vieira (October 31, 2017 – February 13, 2018)
  Petit (February 12, 2018 – May 13, 2018)
  Ivo Vieira (May 29, 2018 – May 19, 2019)
  Vítor Campelos (May 27, 2019 – December 16, 2019)
  Ricardo Soares (December 18, 2019 – November 9, 2020)
  César Peixoto (November 10, 2020 - January 2, 2020)
  Vasco Seabra (January 6, 2021 – June 5, 2021)
  João Henriques (June 5, 2021 – December 2, 2021)
  Lito Vidigal (December 4, 2021 – January 5, 2022)
  Ricardo Sá Pinto (January 7, 2022 – May 31, 2022)
  Paulo Alves (June 8, 2022 – )

References

External links

Official website 
Zerozero team profile

 
Association football clubs established in 1938
Football clubs in Portugal
1938 establishments in Portugal
Primeira Liga clubs
Liga Portugal 2 clubs